This list of Parlophone artists records the more notable musicians that are or have been signed by the company. , the roster includes Lily Allen, Coldplay, Victoria Canal, David Guetta, Gorillaz, The Snuts, Conor Maynard, Aya Nakamura, Soprano and PinkPantheress. Its contemporary label, His Master's Voice, was focused on classical music and ceased issuing popular music recordings in 1967; later known as EMI Classics, it was absorbed into Warner Classics in 2013; afterwards, English Columbia was replaced by the EMI pop label.

Parlophone also operates Regal, a contemporary revival of the historic Columbia Graphophone budget/reissue label founded in 1914, and the French urban music label Rec.118, founded in 2016.

Because Parlophone Records Ltd. absorbed the catalogues of EMI Records UK, Roulette Records, the Columbia Graphophone Company (EMI Columbia), His Master's Voice, non-U.S. former artists of Harvest Records and some European divisions of EMI Music (with new reissues bearing the Parlophone label), only artists whose recordings were originally issued by Parlophone are listed here, either during its time as a subsidiary of EMI (1931–2012) or as a Warner Music sub-label (2013–present).

Notable artists whose recordings were originally released on Parlophone

A to E

 Ilkka Alanko
 Damon Albarn
 Pablo Alboran (All of Pablo Alboran's albums originally released between 2011 and 2012 on EMI Music Spain are now owned by Parlophone Spain/Warner Music.)
 Alice in Chains (EMI originally released the band's 2009 studio album, Black Gives Way to Blue, in the UK through the Parlophone label. The album is now internationally controlled by Virgin Records and Universal Music Group.)
 All Saints
 Lily Allen
 Marc Almond
 Gabrielle Aplin
 Kim Appleby
 Ashnikko
 Arcadia
 Athlete (The band's back catalogue is controlled by newly independent, former EMI label Chrysalis Records and Blue Raincoat.)
 Jean-Louis Aubert (All of Jean-Louis Aubert's albums originally released between 1989 and 2012 on Virgin France and EMI Music France are now owned by Parlophone France/Warner Music.)
 Babyshambles
 John Barry Seven
 Bassheads
 Bat for Lashes
 The Beatles (The band's entire catalogue is retained by Universal Music Group and owned by Calderstone Productions Limited.)
 Belouis Some
 Classix Nouveaux
 Cliff Bennett and the Rebel Rousers
 Cilla Black
 Bliss
 Blur
 Steve Booker
 Brodinski
 The Chemical Brothers (The duo's catalogue is retained by Universal Music Group and now controlled by the new EMI Records and Astralwerks.)
 Chiddy Bang
 Chingy
 Chromeo
 Julien Clerc (All of Julien Clerc's albums originally released between 1970 and 2012 on Odeon Records, Pathé Records, Virgin France and EMI Music France are now owned by Parlophone France/Warner Music.)
 Club Cheval
 Joe Cocker
 Avishai Cohen
 Coldplay (Parlophone/Capitol, 2000–2014, Parlophone/Atlantic, 2014–present)
 Graham Coxon
 Bernard Cribbins
 Jim Dale
 Danger Mouse
 Dilated Peoples
 Dinosaur Pile-Up (Parlophone/Roadrunner/Elektra)
 Dirty Vegas (The band's back catalogue on EMI/Capitol/Parlophone is controlled by independent label New State Entertainment Limited.)
 Divine Comedy
 Pete Doherty
 Eliza Doolittle
 Duran Duran
 Idris Elba
 Electronic (The duo's entire catalogue is controlled in the US and Canada by Warner Records.)
 EMF (The rights to the band's Parlophone catalogue are managed by Believe Digital.)

F to J
 Adam Faith
 Shane Fenton
 Sky Ferreira (EMI originally released her 2010 single, One, in the UK and Europe through the Parlophone label. The single is now internationally controlled by Virgin Records and Universal Music Group.)
 Shane Filan
 Neil Finn (Two of Neil Finn's studio albums, 1998's Try Whistling This and 2001's One Nil, were distributed in the UK, Europe and Australasia through EMI and Parlophone. Both albums are now controlled by Finn's vanity label, Lester Records.)
 The Finn Brothers
 Flanders & Swann
 The Fourmost
 David Fray
 Gass
 Gesaffelstein
 Goldfrapp (The duo's 2012 compilation album, The Singles, was originally released in Europe as a joint partnership between EMI/Parlophone and Mute Records. It is now solely controlled by Mute as a BMG Rights Management subsidiary.)
 The Good, the Bad & the Queen
 The Good Natured
 The Goons
 Gorillaz
 David Guetta (All of David Guetta's albums originally released between 2002 and 2012 on Virgin France and EMI Music France are now owned by Parlophone France/Warner Music.)
 George Harrison (George Harrison's entire catalogue on Dark Horse Records, Parlophone and EMI is retained by Universal Music Group and owned by Calderstone Productions Limited.)
 Richard Hawley
 Becky Hill
 The Hollies
 Hot Chip
 Hyphen Hyphen
 Idlewild
 Igit
 Interpol
 Inti-Illimani
 Iron Maiden (The band's entire catalogue is controlled in the US and Canada by BMG Rights Management through Sanctuary Records.)
 Thomas Jack
 Jamelia
 Dick James
 Norah Jones (Two of Norah Jones's studio albums, 2002's Come Away With Me and 2004's Feels Like Home, were distributed in the UK and Europe through the Parlophone label. Both albums are now internationally controlled and reissued by Blue Note Records and Universal Music Group.)

K to O
 Kano
 Georgi Kay
 Keith Kelly
 The King Brothers
 Beverley Knight
 Kraftwerk
 Billy J. Kramer and The Dakotas
 Kay Kyser
 Late of the Pier
 Mary Lee
 Bobby Lewis
 Lasse Lindh
 Laurie London
 Bonnie Lou
 Love Sculpture
 Jeremy Lubbock
 Humphrey Lyttelton
 Mansun (The band's entire catalogue on Parlophone is retained by Snapper Music and is now controlled by Kscope.)
 Matoma
 Matrix & Futurebound
 Conor Maynard
 Paul McCartney (Paul McCartney's entire catalogue on Parlophone and EMI is now retained by Universal Music Group and owned by MPL Communications.)
 Mickey 3D (All of the band's albums originally released between 1998 and 2012 on Virgin France and EMI Music France are now owned by Parlophone France/Warner Music.)
 Kylie Minogue (All of Kylie Minogue's albums released from 2000 to 2015 are distributed worldwide through Parlophone Records Limited, except in Australia where Festival Mushroom Records and Warner Music Australasia handle the distribution.)
 Matt Monro
 Ivor Moreton and Dave Kaye
 Morning Parade
 Morrissey
 MPHO
 Mrs Mills
 Aya Nakamura (Signed to Rec. 118.)
 Ninho (Signed to Rec. 118.)

P to T
 The Paramounts
 Bob and Alf Pearson
 Pet Shop Boys
 PinkPantheress
 Matt Pokora
 Duffy Power
 Queen (The band's entire catalogue is now controlled by Universal Music Enterprises internationally and by Hollywood Records in the US and Canada.)
 Queen + Paul Rodgers (same as the previous band)
 Radiohead (As of 2016, the band's entire back catalogue, originally released on EMI and Parlophone from 1993 to 2004, is now controlled by XL Recordings, a Beggars Group sub-label. US distribution was also formerly handled by Warner Music's Alternative Distribution Alliance until 2020, when Beggars switched distributors to Redeye.)
 Rainbow Ffolly
 Rat Boy
 Renaud (All of Renaud's albums originally released between 1985 and 2009 on Virgin France and EMI Music France are now owned by Parlophone France/Warner Music.)
 Sigur Rós
 Roxette
 Neljä Ruusua
 Safia
 Saint Motel
 Mike Sarne
 Scarlet Party
 SCH (Signed to Rec. 118.)
 Peter Sellers
 Shampoo
 Silver Bullet
 Luke Sital-Singh
 Skin
 Soprano (Signed to Rec. 118.)
 Alain Souchon (All of Alain Souchon's albums originally released between 1985 and 2011 on Virgin France and EMI Music France are now owned by Parlophone France/Warner Music.)
 Soulwax
 Sparklehorse (EMI originally released the band's first two studio albums, 1995's Vivadixiesubmarinetransmissionplot and 1998's Good Morning Spider, in the UK through the Parlophone label. These albums are now internationally controlled by Capitol Records and Universal Music Group.)
 Dusty Springfield
 Dorothy Squires
 St. Germain
 Stereophonics
 Supergrass (As of 2017, the band's catalogue is controlled by BMG Rights Management through The Echo Label.)
 Synapson
 Tages
 Talk Talk (Warner Music owns the entirety of the band's catalogue originally released on EMI UK and Parlophone from 1982 to 1988 -including the 1998 compilation Asides Besides-, except for their fifth and final studio album, Laughing Stock, released in 1991 on Verve Records and Polydor Records.)
 Vince Taylor
 The Temperance Seven
 Tinie Tempah
 Bobby Tench
 Teresa Teng
 Gyllene Tider
 Tomorrow
 Tina Turner
 Two Door Cinema Club
 The Snuts

U to Z
 VANT
 The Verve (EMI originally released the band's 2008 studio album, Forth, in Europe through the Parlophone label. It is now controlled by Virgin Records and Universal Music Group in this territory.)
 Victoria Canal
 The Vipers Skiffle Group
 Waltari
 W.A.S.P.
 Otis Waygood
 Paul Weller
 Keith West
 Hindi Zahra

Notable artists whose recordings are re-issued by Parlophone and Warner Music but were originally distributed by other labels

 2Be3
 Adiemus
 Air (Parlophone France/Warner Music owns the duo's first three studio albums and debut EP that were originally released on Virgin France and EMI from 1997 to 2004: Premiers Symptômes, Moon Safari, 10 000 Hz Legend and Talkie Walkie.)
 Akhenaton
 Ärsenik
 Charles Aznavour
 Syd Barrett (Parlophone UK/Warner Music owns the entirety of Syd Barrett's solo catalogue, as his recordings were originally released on EMI UK and the European division of Harvest Records.)
 Jeff Beck (Jeff Beck's first two studio albums, 1968's Truth and 1969's Beck-Ola, which were originally released on EMI Columbia in Europe and Japan, are now distributed by Parlophone UK/Warner Music in these territories. Both albums are still owned by Epic Records and Sony Music Entertainment in North America.)
 Bonzo Dog Doo-Dah Band
 David Bowie (Parlophone UK/Warner Music owns the entirety of David Bowie's solo catalogue recorded from 1969 -David Bowie (Space Oddity)- to 1999 -LiveAndWell.com-. His post-2002 catalogue, counting studio and live albums such as Heathen, Reality, A Reality Tour, The Next Day, Blackstar and No Plan, is distributed and owned by Columbia Records and Sony Music Entertainment, whereas his catalogue on Deram Records including his 1967 self-titled debut studio album is owned by Decca Records and Universal Music Group.)
 Burning Spear
 Kate Bush (Parlophone UK/Warner Music owns Kate Bush's three first studio albums that were originally released on EMI UK from 1979 to 1980: The Kick Inside, Lionheart and Never for Ever. The remainder of her catalogue is owned and copyrighted by her own company, Noble and Brite Ltd., but Parlophone is still in charge of its worldwide distribution.)
 Matthieu Chedid
 Count Basie
 Daft Punk (Between 2013 and 2021, Parlophone France and Warner Music France held the ownership of the duo's catalogue that was originally released on Virgin France and EMI Music France from 1995 -Da Funk- to 2007 -Alive 2007-. As of 2021, the Virgin Records catalogue is now re-issued through the duo's vanity label "Daft Life Ltd." and the Warner Music Group subsidiary Alternative Distribution Alliance. Their fourth and final studio album, Random Access Memories, was released in 2013 on Columbia Records and Sony Music Entertainment. Their 2010 Tron: Legacy soundtrack is owned by Walt Disney Records and Universal Music Group.)
 Étienne Daho (Parlophone France/Warner Music owns all of Étienne Daho's recordings which were originally released between 1981 and 2010 on Virgin, Capitol and EMI Music in France.)
 Kiki Dee
 Deep Purple (In Europe, Parlophone UK/Warner Music owns and distributes all of Deep Purple's albums which were released between 1968 -Shades of Deep Purple- and 1971 -Fireball- on EMI and the European division of Harvest Records. These recordings are still owned and distributed by Warner Records in North America. Universal Music Enterprises handles the re-releases of Purple Records-era albums originally recorded between 1972 and 1975, starting with Machine Head. UMe also owns Abandon and Bananas, the band's last EMI albums previously released in selected European countries.)
 Doc Gynéco (Parlophone France/Warner Music owns all of Doc Gynéco's recordings that were originally released between 1996 and 2002 on Virgin France and EMI Music France.)
 Diam's (Parlophone France/Warner Music owns the entirety of Diam's' catalogue, as all of her recordings were originally released on Delabel, Virgin France and EMI Music France.)
 Dr. Feelgood
 The Dubliners
 Baxter Dury (Parlophone UK/Warner Music owns Baxter Dury's only release on EMI UK, 2011's Happy Soup.)
 Brigitte Fontaine (Parlophone France/Warner Music owns all of Brigitte Fontaine's recordings that were originally released between 1995 -Genre humain- and 2004's -Rue Saint Louis En L'île- on Virgin France and EMI Music France.)
 Fischer-Z
 Gabinete Caligari
 Gang of Four (Parlophone UK/Warner Music distributes the band's first four studio albums -Entertainment!, Solid Gold, Songs of the Free and Hard- plus the untitled 1980 Yellow EP in Europe, as they were originally released on EMI in this territory. These recordings are still owned and distributed by Warner Records in North America.)
 David Gilmour (In Europe, Parlophone UK/Warner Music owns and distributes all of David Gilmour's live and studio albums originally released on EMI Records and the European division of Harvest Records between 1978 -David Gilmour- and 2008 -Live in Gdańsk- in this territory. These recordings are still owned and distributed by Columbia Records in North America.)
 Raymond van het Groenewoud
 Geri Halliwell (Parlophone UK/Warner Music owns the entirety of Geri Halliwell's solo catalogue, as all of her recordings were originally released on EMI UK.)
 Hawkwind
 Hercules and Love Affair
 Héroes del Silencio (The band's entire back catalogue is owned by Parlophone Spain/Warner Music, as all of their studio and live recordings were originally released on EMI Music Spain between 1987 and 2011.)
 Hot Chocolate
 IAM (Parlophone France/Warner Music owns all of the band's recordings that were originally released between 1991 -...De la planète Mars- and 2003 -Revoir un printemps- on Delabel, Virgin France and EMI Music France).
 Jethro Tull
 Kajagoogoo
 KC and the Sunshine Band
 Larusso (Parlophone France/Warner Music owns the entirety of Larusso's catalogue, as all of her recordings were originally released on EMI Music France.)
 LCD Soundsystem (Warner Music owns the entirety of the band's catalogue that was originally released on EMI/DFA/Capitol in North America and EMI/Parlophone/Virgin in Europe from 2005 to 2010. During the band's hiatus, Parlophone and Warner Bros. Records released in 2014 the live album The Long Goodbye: LCD Soundsystem Live at Madison Square Garden, that compromised the entirety of what was billed at the time their "final" show held at Madison Square Garden in April 2011. Since 2017 and the release of their fourth studio album American Dream, the band belongs to the Columbia Records roster.)
 Louisiana Red
 Machiavel
 Gérard Manset
 Marillion (The live album Made Again is only distributed by Parlophone/Warner Music in the UK and by BMG Rights Management, owner of Sanctuary Records, worldwide. The rest of the EMI catalogue, released between 1982 and 1994, is solely owned by Parlophone UK.)
 Jeanne Mas
 Nick Mason
 Milk Inc. 
 Marc Moulin
 The Move
 Róisín Murphy
 Beth Orton (Parlophone UK/Warner Music owns two of her studio albums and one compilation that were originally released on Heavenly Recordings/EMI in Europe and Astralwerks in North America from 2002 to 2006: Daybreaker, The Other Side of Daybreak and Comfort of Strangers.)
 Phœnix (Parlophone France/Warner Music owns three of the band's studio albums that were originally released on Virgin France and EMI Music France from 2000 to 2006: United, Alphabetical and It's Never Been Like That.)
 Pilot
 Pink Floyd (Parlophone and Warner Music only distributes Pink Floyd's catalogue in Europe. At a worldwide scale, the distribution is done by Legacy Recordings and Sony Music Entertainment.)
 The Proclaimers
 The Ramones (Europe/UK only; Geffen Records and Universal Music Enterprises own the US and Canadian rights to the band's recordings originally released by MCA Records-distributed Radioactive Records label.)
 Dick Rivers
 Diana Ross (In Europe, Parlophone UK/Warner Music owns and distributes all of Diana Ross' albums originally released on Capitol Records and EMI Music Group between 1981 -Why Do Fools Fall in Love- and 2006 -I Love You- in this territory. In North America, her 1981-1987 RCA Records catalogue is still owned by Sony Music Entertainment, whereas her 1989-2006 Motown catalogue is owned by parent company Universal Music Group.)
 Röyksopp
 Kate Ryan
 The Seekers
 The Shadows
 Shurik'n
 Labi Siffre
 Nina Simone
 Spandau Ballet (Parlophone UK/Warner Music owns four of the band's studio albums that were originally released on Chrysalis Records from 1981 to 1984: Journeys to Glory, Diamond, True and Parade.)
 Starsailor
 Al Stewart
 The Stranglers
 Talking Heads (In Europe and the UK, Parlophone/Warner Music owns and distributes the band's 1984-1988 catalogue, including studio and live albums such as Stop Making Sense, Little Creatures, True Stories and Naked. The mentioned recordings were originally released on EMI Records in these territories, and are still distributed by Sire Records/Warner Records in North America.)
 Téléphone (Parlophone France/Warner Music owns the entirety of the band's catalogue, as all of their live and studio recordings were originally released on EMI Columbia, Pathé Records, Virgin France and EMI Music France between 1977 and 2000.)
 Jake Thackray
 The Juan MacLean (Parlophone UK/Warner Music owns The Juan McLean's debut studio album, 2005's Less Than Human, as it was originally released on EMI/DFA in Europe and Astralwerks in North America.)
 Thunder
 Yann Tiersen (Parlophone France/Warner Music owns all of Yann Tiersen's recordings which were originally released between 2001 and 2006 on Labels, Virgin France and EMI Music France.)
 Tin Machine (Parlophone UK/Warner Music owns the band's 1988 debut self-titled studio album that was originally released on EMI USA. A previously unreleased live album titled Live at La Cigale, Paris, 25th June, 1989 was released in August 2019 by Parlophone and the David Bowie Estate. The band's second and final studio album, 1992's Tin Machine II, is still distributed and owned by Victor Entertainment.)
 Peter Tosh
 Twelve Caesars (Parlophone Sweden/Warner Music owns all of Twelve Caesars' recordings which were originally released between 2002 and 2008 on Astralwerks, Virgin Records and EMI Music Sweden).
 Vanessa-Mae (Parlophone UK/Warner Music owns all of Vanessa-Mae's recordings which were originally released between 1995 and 2001 on EMI UK).
 Sarah Vaughan
 Dinah Washington
 Whitesnake
 Dana Winner
 Roy Wood
 The Yardbirds
 Zaho

References

Parlophone